La Calera is a municipality and town of Colombia in the Guavio Province, part of the department of Cundinamarca.
La Calera is located in the Eastern Ranges of the Colombian Andes, east of the capital and overlooking part of it. La Calera borders Guasca, Sopó and Chía in the north, Guasca and Junín in the east, Bogotá in the west and Choachí and Fómeque in the south.

Etymology 
The name of the town is derived from the limestone mine, called calera.

History 
The area of La Calera was before the Spanish conquest inhabited by the Muisca. La Calera, just behind the mountains bordering Bacatá was ruled by the zipa based in the southern capital.

Modern La Calera was founded on December 16, 1772 by Pedro de Tovar y Buendía.

Economy 
Main economical activity in La Calera is cement mining. The geological formation outcropping in the municipality is the Guaduas Formation.

Born in La Calera 
 Israel Corredor, former professional cyclist

Gallery

References 

Municipalities of Cundinamarca Department
Muisca Confederation
Populated places established in 1772
1770s establishments in the Viceroyalty of New Granada
1772 establishments in South America